Olha Mykhailivna Vasylevska-Smahliuk (born 23 June 1985) is a Ukrainian journalist and politician currently serving as a People's Deputy of Ukraine representing Ukraine's 96th electoral district as a member of Servant of the People since 2019. Previously, she was a journalist for the 1+1 television network.

Early life and career 
Olha Mykhailivna Vasylevska-Smahliuk was born on 23 June 1985 in the city of Starokostiantyniv in Ukraine's western Khmelnytskyi Oblast.

Prior to her election, Vasylevska-Smahliuk was a journalist, first at Kyiv-based newspaper The Day before later moving to the television channel 1+1, owned by oligarch Ihor Kolomoyskyi where she served as an investigative journalist for political and economic issues, particularly for investigations into corruption.

Political career 
In the 2019 Ukrainian parliamentary election, Vasylevska-Smahliuk ran for the office of People's Deputy of Ukraine in Ukraine's 96th electoral district, located in northern Kyiv Oblast. She was the candidate of Servant of the People, though at the time of the election she was an independent. She was successfully elected, defeating independent incumbent Yaroslav Moskalenko with 41.85% of the vote to Moskalenko's 18.03%.

In the Verkhovna Rada (parliament of Ukraine), Vasylevska-Smahliuk joined the Servant of the People faction, as well as the Verkhovna Rada Committee on Finances, Taxes, and Customs Policy and inter-factional associations "A Country Accessible to Everyone" and "For Khmelnychchyna". She is regarded by anti-corruption non-governmental organisation Chesno to be a member of the "Kolomoyskyi Group", an informal group of Servant of the People deputies tied to Ihor Kolomoyskyi.

References 

1985 births
Living people
Ninth convocation members of the Verkhovna Rada
Servant of the People (political party) politicians
Women members of the Verkhovna Rada